Maschio latino cercasi (also known as L'affare si ingrossa) is a 1977 commedia sexy all'italiana film directed by Giovanni Narzisi and starring Dayle Haddon, Gloria Guida, and Stefania Casini.

Cast
Adriana Asti as Sisina
Gino Bramieri as Bubi Bislecchi / Otto Himmel
Vittorio Caprioli as Carmine
Stefania Casini as Anna
Gianfranco D'Angelo as the German tourist
Salvatore Funari as Nanninella
Carlo Giuffrè as Baron Nicolino di Castropizzo
Gloria Guida as Gigia
Dayle Haddon as the lawyer
Aldo Maccione as Amilcare
Orazio Orlando as Gennarino Esposito
Brigitte Petronio as Frau Walter			
Luciano Salce as Guido Fiasconi

References

External links
 

1977 films
Commedia sexy all'italiana
1970s sex comedy films
1977 comedy films
1970s Italian films